Minuscule 79 (in the Gregory-Aland numbering), ε 529 (von Soden), known as Codex Georg Douzae, is a Greek-Latin minuscule manuscript of the New Testament, on parchment leaves. Palaeographically it has been assigned to the 15th century. It was adapted for liturgical use.

Description 

The codex contains almost complete the text of the four Gospels with one large lacunae (Matthew 1:1-14:13) on 208 parchment leaves (size ). The text is written in two columns per page, 26-28 lines per page. The initial letters in red.

The Greek text of the codex in some parts represents the Byzantine text-type, in other parts is mixed. Kurt Aland did not place it in any Category.

According to the Claremont Profile Method it represents textual family Kx in Luke 1. In Luke 10 and Luke 20 it has mixed Byzantine text.

History 
Georg Douza brought this codex from Constantinople in 1597. It was cited by Frans Comer von Brügge.

It is currently housed in at the Leiden University Library (B. P. Gr. 74), at Leiden.

See also 

 List of New Testament minuscules
 Biblical manuscript
 Textual criticism

References 

Greek New Testament minuscules
15th-century biblical manuscripts